Yuri Alexandrovich Bychkov  (1 September 1931 – 18 April 2016) was an art historian, a member of the Union of Artists and the Union of Theatre Workers of the Russian Federation, director of  writer's house museum Melikhovo in 1994-2004.

He graduated from the Moscow Aviation Institute.

Author of the idea, the pioneer of tourism Golden Ring. One of the founders VOOPIK (All-Russian Society for Historic Preservation and Cultural Organization).

He died in Moscow on 18 April 2016.

References

External links 

 Биография
 Бычков

1931 births
2016 deaths
People from Chekhovsky District
Moscow Aviation Institute alumni
Russian art historians
Soviet art historians
Directors of museums in Russia
Russian literary historians
Soviet literary historians
Soviet male writers
20th-century Russian male writers